Ana Vrcelj (born 1993) is a Serbian beauty queen who placed 2nd runner-up at Miss Serbia 2012; she represented Serbia at the Miss Universe 2013.

Early life
Ana studied at the Faculty of Forestry and speaks English. Her hobbies are riding bikes, roller-skating, and skiing.

Designations
Nikolina Bojić was crowned Miss Serbia 2013 but was dethroned after it was revealed that she was married. Aleksandra Doknić (previously Miss Serbia 2013 for Miss Universe) took her place as Serbia's representative for Miss World, while Vrcelj became Serbia's representative for Miss Universe.

Miss Universe 2013
Vrcelj represented Serbia at Miss Universe 2013 in Moscow, Russia; she failed to place in the semifinals.

References

1993 births
Living people
Serbian female models
Miss Universe 2013 contestants
Serbian beauty pageant winners